Robert Yao Ramesar (born May 2, 1963) is a Trinidadian director, screenwriter and film lecturer. He has created over 120 films on the people, history and culture of Trinidad and Tobago. 

His credits in television include the She Woman series produced for the United Nations Beijing Conference in 1996, which was broadcast live to the Caribbean region, and the award-winning People and Routes series. Collaborating with Nobel laureate Derek Walcott, Ramesar directed The Saddhu of Couva and The Coral, the first screen adaptations of Walcott's poetry. Ramesar also produced seminal documentaries on the pioneers of the steelband movement, traditional Carnival characters, indentureship, emancipation, religious rituals and the myriad festivals and celebrations of Trinidad and Tobago.

Early years
Ramesar was born in Tamale, Ghana, West Africa in 1963 to Esmond Ramesar, a Trinidad educator, and Mariane Ramesar (née Soares), a Jamaican historian. He has two older sisters: Celia Gibbings and Deborah Shirley. After leaving Ghana, the Ramesar family travelled to Trinidad and Tobago and Jamaica then finally settled in Ontario, Canada in 1966.

Upon the family's return to Trinidad and Tobago in 1971, Ramesar frequently attended the movie theaters located in Tunapuna, St. Augustine, and Curepe. While studying in high school in Port-of-Spain, he regularly took advantage of opportunities to attend the movie theaters in his area. According to Ramesar himself, one of his childhood friends from primary school reminded him about 30 years later that she wrote in her diary the intended careers of her classmates, and that time, he wanted to be a filmmaker.

In 1984, Ramesar left Trinidad and Tobago to enter the School of Communications in Howard University. He pursued a Bachelor of Arts in Film Production, and graduated with a summa cum laude distinction. He also became president of the Howard University's Film Students' Association, and in 1988, he went on a hunger strike to prevent the closure of the campus-based film school. Afterwards, he pursued a Master of Fine Arts in Film Directing, and was mentored by Ethiopian filmmaker Haile Gerima during that period. On completion of his studies, Ramesar immediately returned to Trinidad and Tobago to begin his mission of teaching and developing indigenous cinema in his homeland.

Film career

1990s
Upon his return to Trinidad and Tobago, Ramesar was employed in by the Government Information Service as a director/producer. It was during this decade that most of his seminal shorts on the culture of Trinidad and Tobago were made. the earliest of his shorts was Mami Wata (1992), the first on-screen depiction of an Orisha feast for the goddess Oshun. He went on to do a film series of interviews with the pioneers of the steelband movement, which includes Pan: The Overture (1993) and Pan under the Sapodilla Tree (1994). Time has proven such work infinitely precious, as many of those interviewed have already passed away, with Ramesar being the only one to capture many of their stories.

Also notable have been his shorts on traditional Carnival figures and players (Minstrel Lady, 1998; Robber Talk, 1998; Black Indian, 1998; Fire Dance, 1998; Masquerade, 1998), East Indian culture (Jahaaji Mai, 1995; Children of Fatel Razack, 1998; Journey to Ganga Mai, 1999) and Tobago culture (A Wedding in Moriah, 1997). His work in the short film form also covered many other themes such as cricket (Spinner's Wicket, 1998), parang (Spanish Time, 1998) and more contemporary subjects such as the cottage industries created by people living near a garbage dump in Arima (Picking Up the Pieces, 1999). Ramesar's work gained wide appeal and attained many awards. His early shorts which were also shown on prime time television as part of Trinidad and Tobago's regular Government Information Service programming.

2000s
Ramesar was the featured filmmaker at Carifesta VII in St. Kitts & Nevis (2000). Additionally, he filmed Trinidad and Tobago's cultural participation at Carifesta VIII in Suriname (2003) and chaired the Carifesta Film Committee in Trinidad and Tobago (2006).

In 2001, Ramesar participated in the Big River International Artists' Workshop and Exhibition. The following year, he directed the filming of the acclaimed musical Carnival Messiah in the United Kingdom. His work was featured in the first National Sculpture Exhibition, and at the first Kairi film Festival, in Trinidad in 2003.

In 2002 and 2003, Ramesar took part in the inaugural and second editions of the Festival of African and Caribbean Film (Barbados), where he delivered a public lecture and screened films; Caribbean Input screening in Jamaica; the Zanzibar International Film Festival (Republic of Tanzania); Cine Latino Film Festival (San Francisco); Sin Fronteras, University of Wisconsin, Madison, where he conducted a week-long workshop on Caribbean film; and Swimming Against the Tides, Caribbean Culture in the Age of Globalization, Bowdoin College, Maine, where he lectured and screened films. His work was also featured at the VideoBrasil Festival, São Paulo, in 2003.

In 2006, Ramesar's fantasy drama SistaGod – which he directed, wrote and produced – premiered at the Toronto International Film Festival and was subsequently screened at the Trinidad and Tobago Film Festival. The first chapter of a film trilogy, it tells the story of the coming of a black female messiah (played by Evelyn Caesar Munroe) during a period known as the "Apocalypso". The movie integrated traditional Trinbagonian Carnival characters and a powerful female lead into its narrative, whilst tackling issues such as westernization, spiritualism and culture. Sistagod remains the sole Trinidad and Tobago feature film to gain official selection at a major international film festival.

In 2007, Ramesar served as the first filmmaker in residence at the University of the West Indies. Film theory on the UWI film Programme was introduced in 2006 by the co designers of the BA in Film, Dr Jean Antoine-Dunne, who taught film theory and aesthetics and Dr Bruce Paddington. 
Ramesar wrote, produced and directed Her Second Coming in 2009. The second chapter of his SistaGod trilogy, Her Second Coming centers on SistaGod (played in this movie by real-life albino actress/singer Crystal Felix) and her progeny battling for survival in a post-apocalyptic world devoid of human life. The film made its world premiere at the Trinidad and Tobago Film Festival in the same year.

In 2009, Ramesar co-founded the Caribbean Travelling Film School, which aims to incubate filmmaking talent throughout the Caribbean region. This is, in part, a continuum of a blueprint he developed in the 1980s for the consolidation of a regional cinema, which would involve filmmakers traveling in Caribbean communities and fostering a citizens' cinema, which he termed "The Moving Image".

2010s
In 2010, Ramesar worked on his yet-to-be-released third feature film, Stranger in Paradise, which involved a Chinese woman arriving in Barbados speaking only Mandarin. In 2014, Ramesar flew to South Africa to begin work on his next feature film, Shade, which centred on a young albino woman (Mathapelo Ditshego) from Soshanguve, South Africa, with dreams of becoming an R&B singer.

Ramesar's next feature film, Haiti Bride, released in 2014, is the story of a Haitian-born woman who returns to her homeland to meet her husband who lost his memory after the 2010 Haiti earthquake. Shot entirely on location in Haiti, it was the first African diaspora / Caribbean feature film selected in the 2015 feature film competition at the Pan African Film & Television Festival, Africa's largest and oldest film festival, in Ouagadougou, Burkina Faso. Ramesar was the first Caribbean filmmaker in the festival's history to compete for the prestigious Etalon de Yennenga award.

Between the months of July to August 2015, he visited India, specifically Mumbai, Delhi, Agra and Goa, where he continued fostering partnerships with film schools, as well as researching film education and production infrastructures. He met and held discussions with the heads of film schools in Delhi – namely Jamia Millia (Central University), Delhi, and the Asian Academy of Media Studies Film School at Filmcity, New Delhi – towards establishing a relationship between their respective institutions, along with seeking co-production, undergraduate exchange and post-graduate opportunities for the film students of University of the West Indies (St. Augustine Campus).

Ramesar held discussions with two key industry bodies, in which he was granted lifetime memberships, namely the International Chamber of Media and Entertainment Industry (ICMEI) and the International Film and Television Club (IFTC). At the IFTC, located in the Marwah Studios Complex, Film City (India's fastest-growing film studio), he spent a half-day meeting with the Studio Head. He was also honoured to be at the commencement exercises at the Asian Academy of Media Studies Film School in the capacity of guest lecturer, a visit that further led to discussions of collaboration between India and Trinidad's film institutions.

In December 2015, he screened Haiti Bride at both the 2015 edition of the Ghetto Biennale, a cross-cultural arts festival held in Port-au-Prince, Haiti, and in the commune of Jacmel, where most of the film was shot.

Caribbeing
In 1970, while travelling with his family on the Federal Maple, a West Indian inter-island ferry, Ramesar coined the word "Caribbeing" to his father in relation to how some of the other passengers pronounced the word "Caribbean". In his eventual film career, he applied the word "Caribbeing" to describe his trademark cinematic aesthetic. This aesthetic almost always contains one or more of the following elements: the use of natural light (sunlight) as the primary source of lighting for the camera, light reflected off bodies of water, natural landscape as character, iconic gestures of Caribbean body language, the cadence of the spoken Creole language, and narratives historically unique to the Caribbean space. Additionally, it became both the title of a nine-minute short which he made in 1995, and the name of his company.

Awards and honors
Honors for his work include the Paul Robeson Awards (US) for Best Film & Best Editing (1990) and Best Cinematography (1991); the Critics' Choice Award at the Global Africa Film Festival (US) 1992; the Royal Bank/MATT awards for Best Television Series 1996; Best Editing, Best Supporting Video and Best Television Series 1997; Best Supporting Video 1998 (Trinidad); the Saraswatti Devi Award 2000; and Decibel Award 2002; Most Popular Feature Film, Flashpoint Film Festival (Jamaica) 2006; Caribbean Cinema Award, Studio 66 Arts Support Community (Trinidad) 2006; Best Caribbean Film and Best Director, Bridgetown Film Festival (Barbados) 2007; BPTT Pioneer in Film Award for Trinidad and Tobago Film Festival (2013); (WIPO) World Intellectual Property Day Award for Sistagod (2014); ArtoDocs International Film Festival Grand Prix Award for Sistagod (2014).

Screenings
Ramesar's films were screened in more than 100 countries throughout Africa, Asia, North, South and Central America, Eastern and Western Europe and throughout the Caribbean.multi-channel cable simulcasts (California) 1992/93, WHMM-32 (Washington) 1990, European Media Arts Festival (Germany)1992, Reel Caribe (Toronto) 1996, MIDEM (Cannes) 1996, Smithsonian Institution(Washington) 1992, Oakland Museum of California 1992, Athens International Film Festival 1992, Darryl Reich Rubenstein Gallery (Virginia) 1987, Washington DC Artworks 1988, Carifesta V, VI, VII, VIII and IX (1994, 1995, 2000, 2003 and 2006) and the "Sing Me a Rainbow" Meridian International Center's US-wide touring exhibition, 1998, the Noir Tout Couleurs Festival of Cinema (Guadeloupe) 1998 & 1999.

In 2000, the Jornada Film Festival in Bahia, Brazil, the BRNO16 Film Festival in the Czech Republic and the Tabernacle Trust Exhibition of Films on Trinidad Carnival (London) featured Ramesar's work. That year, the Cavehill Film Society, Barbados, also screened a retrospective of Ramesar's works. In 2001, his work was screened at Fespaco's International Festival of African Cinema in Burkina Faso, and in 2001 and 2003 at Cinefest Nuestra America in Wisconsin. His films were also included in the IDB's First Latin and Caribbean Video Art Exhibition, which toured cities throughout the Americas, as well as Washington DC and Rome.

In 2004, he was a delegate at the Art Council of England's A Free State conference, at the British Museum, where he screened selected work. He was also a featured artist at the Lighting the Shadow exhibition at CCA7. His work was also screened at the Museum Ludwig (Cologne) 2005; The Horniman Museum (London) 2006; Jakmel Film Festival (Haiti) 2006; Flashpoint Film Festival (Jamaica) 2006 and the Pan African Film Festival (Los Angeles) 2007; Bridgetown Film Festival (Barbados) 2007; Black Harvest Film Festival (Chicago) 2007; The British Museum (London) 2007; Caribbean Tales (Toronto) 2007; GRULAC (Johannesburg) 2007; Kerala International Film Festival (India) 2008; Kampala Film Festival (Uganda) 2008; DC-Caribbean Film Festival (United States) 2008 and The Caribbean Film Festival (New York) 2008.

In 2008, a documentary feature based on Ramesar's work entitled "Films of Yao Ramesar" made its premiere at the DC-Caribbean Film Festival.

Publications
Ramesar's filmography was the subject of Filmed Portraits: an Examination of Themes and the Pictorial Techniques of Yao Ramesar, from his short film series "People", an 87-page work by Pamela Hosein (University of the West Indies), 1998, and a subsequent MPhil thesis by the same author completed in 2008. His work is also examined in PhD theses, including one by Marina Maxwell (University of the West Indies).

2006 saw the completion of a PhD thesis on Ramesar's work entitled Being, Consciousness and Time: Phenomenology and the Videos of Robert Yao Ramesar (G. Hezekiah/University of Toronto). This was published in 2009 as Phenomenology’s Material Presence (Intellect Books/UK and Chicago University Press/US). In a review of the book, it was stated that “the beautiful and innovative video work of Robert Yao Ramesar can carry out philosophy.”

Ramesar has authored a number of articles on Caribbean filmmaking including "Colour, Light & Signification in the Mise-en-Scène of SISTAGOD" (Caribbean Intransit Arts Journal. Volume I. Issue 2 – March 2012); "The Eye-alect of Her Second Coming" (ARC Magazine – Art, Recognition, Culture. Issue 3 – July 2011; "Haiti: Picking Up the Pieces" (article and photo essay –  St. Augustine News – April/July 2011); "Caribbeing: Cultural Imperatives and the Technology of Motion Picture Production" (Caribbean Quarterly, Vol. 42, No. 4, and Caribbean Culture and in the Digital Domain (presented at the Carifesta Symposia 2000, St. Kitts/Nevis).

Filmography

Short films
1985 – American Dream
1986 – Grey
1987 – Going Up
1987 – Confessions of Brother Man
1988 – Going Up
1989 – Rum & Coke
1990 – Bhava Tanha
1991 – Blue Eyes
1992 – Mami Wata
1992 – Clear D' Way
1993 – Pan: The Overture
1994 – Pan Under the Sapodilla Tree
1995 – The Kindest Cut
1995 – Strings & Steel
1995 – Caribbeing
1995 – Songs Across the Rainbow Bridge
1995 – Jahaaji Mai
1996 – Mayaro: The Drum, The Bois & The Moon
1996 – Testament
1996 – Re-Generation
1996 – Parlour People
1997 – Joe Polle's Scarborough Sax
1997 – A Wedding in Moriah
1997 – Mr. Washington's Place in History
1997 – Destiny: Live from Black Rock
1998 – Children of Fatel Razack
1998 – Minstrel Lady
1998 – Robber Talk
1998 – Black Indian
1998 – Fire Dance
1998 – Masquerade
1998 – Batman
1998 – Doubles: Bara Part 1 & Bara Part 2
1998 – Boat a' Dem
1998 – Spinner's Wicket
1998 – Spanish Time
1998 – Chinese Medicine
1998 – Original People
1998 – First People
1998 – A Man of the People
1999 – Olokun: Lord & Mistress of the Deep
1999 – I, Marcus Garvey
1999 – Dancing in the Light
1999 – Body Language
1999 – Stepsisters
1999 – Longdenville Diva
1999 – Foundation
1999 – Spirits Rising
1999 – Picking up the Pieces
1999 – Journey to Ganga Mai
2000 – Celebration
2000 – Man of Steel
2001 – Coronation
2001 – The Saddhu of Couva
2001 – B.C. (Before Columbus)
2002 – Awake
2002 – Bois
2003 – In My Skin
2003 – A Brief History of Queen's Hall
2003 – Tobago to Africa & Back
2003 – Jackie Hinkson: The Work of Art
2003 – An Animated Conversation with Camille Selvon
2003 – Super Moxi Patu
2003 – Canboulay
2004 – The A.B.C's of Traditional Mas
2004 – Carnival Messiah

Feature-length films
2006 – SistaGod
2009 – SistaGod II: Her Second Coming
2010 – Stranger in Paradise
2014 – Shade
2014 – Haiti Bride

References

External links
 Official website

1963 births
Living people
Trinidad and Tobago film directors
Trinidad and Tobago screenwriters